Cervaro is a town and comune (municipality) in the Province of Frosinone in the Italian region Lazio.

Cervaro borders the following municipalities: Cassino, San Vittore del Lazio, Sant'Elia Fiumerapido, Vallerotonda, Viticuso.

History
Cervaro originated from a castle built here in the Early Middle Ages by abbot Petronax of Monte Cassino.

Cervaro was destroyed in the Battle of Monte Cassino during World War II.

Main sights

Church of Madonna de' Piternis
Castle of Monte Trocchio, located in a hill reachable only on a long walk panoramic route. It is situated a short drive from the famous monastery of Monte Cassino.

The Abruzzo, Lazio and Molise National Park is not far.

Transportation

The nearest airport is Rome Ciampino, with access also from Rome Fiumicino and Naples Airport.

Cervaro is easily reachable from Rome by train, bus or car from the Motorway A1 (Cassino exit). Cervaro is also connected by bus from the nearest villages and from the closest city of Cassino where buses link to other Lazio destinations. Cotral is the regional company which operates services in all Lazio.

References

External links
 Official website

Cities and towns in Lazio